Lia Leismüller (29 March 1931 – 6 December 2001) was a German alpine skier for the winter sports club SC Partenkirchen. In 1950, she became the German champion in slalom skiing and subsequently in downhill skiing. In 1952, Leismüller competed in the women's downhill at the 1952 Winter Olympics, where she placed 35th.

References

1931 births
2001 deaths
German female alpine skiers
Olympic alpine skiers of Germany
Alpine skiers at the 1952 Winter Olympics
Sportspeople from Garmisch-Partenkirchen
20th-century German women